Peter Milne (born 1960) is an Australian photographer and visual artist, born and living in Melbourne.

He is known for his early work documenting the 1970s Melbourne punk scene and the first decade of the Melbourne International Comedy Festival. 

The 2018 monograph Fool's Paradise : The Early Years of the Melbourne Comedy Festival consists largely of candid images of comedians taken in bars and backstage. 
In 2020 he published a book of works made in his late teens and early 20s, Juvenalia, with photographs of Rowland S. Howard, Nick Cave and Mick Harvey, their bands The Birthday Party and The Boys Next Door as well as their friends, including Gina Riley, Polly Borland and Anita Lane.

From the early 2000s, Milne's practice has focused on creating narratives using montage, collage and constructed 'film-stills' from movies that don't exist.

Publications
 Fish in a barrel: Nick Cave and the Bad Seeds on Tour. Tender Prey, 1994. Reprinted by 2.13.61. .
 Beautiful lies : notes towards a history of Australia. Queensland Centre for Photography; St Peters, NSW: T&G, 2011. .
 When Nature Forgets. Melbourne: M.33, 2013. .
 A day in the life of Rowland S. Howard. Melbourne: M.33, 2015. .
 The Oddfellow's Daughter. Melbourne: M.33, 2015. .
 Fool's Paradise: The Early Years of The Melbourne Comedy Festival. Melbourne: M.33, 2008. . With essays by Judith Lucy, Sue-Ann Post, Greg Hocking and Kevin Whyte.
 Personal Hygiene. Melbourne: M.33, 2019. .
 Juvenalia. Melbourne: M.33, 2020. .

Collections
Milne's work is held in the following public collections:
Australian Performing Arts Collection,
City Gallery, Melbourne Town Hall, Melbourne, Australia
Monash Gallery of Art, City of Monash, Melbourne, Victoria, Australia

References

External links
 Milne at M.33

1960 births
Australian photographers
Living people
Australian contemporary artists